See of Liverpool may refer to:
Anglican Diocese of Liverpool
Roman Catholic Archdiocese of Liverpool

See also
Episcopal see